Golden Sword or Golden sword may refer to:

 Golden Sword (horse), a racehorse active 2009-2010
The Golden Sword, 1977 Janet Morris novel
Gold Sword for Bravery, Russian decoration (1720-1917)
 The Golden Sword (album), a 1966 jazz album by the Gerald Wilson Orchestra